Clausilia cruciata is a species of air-breathing land snail, a terrestrial pulmonate gastropod mollusk in the family Clausiliidae.

Subspecies
 Clausilia cruciata amiatae E. von Martens, 1873
 Clausilia cruciata bonellii E. von Martens, 1873
 Clausilia cruciata cruciata (S. Studer, 1820)
 Clausilia cruciata cuspidata Held, 1836
 Clausilia cruciata geminella Klemm, 1972
 Clausilia cruciata pedemontana H. Nordsieck, 1990

Distribution 
This species is found in:
 Austria
 Czech Republic
 Ukraine

References

 Bank, R. A.; Neubert, E. (2017). Checklist of the land and freshwater Gastropoda of Europe. Last update: July 16th, 2017
 Sysoev, A. V. & Schileyko, A. A. (2009). Land snails and slugs of Russia and adjacent countries. Sofia/Moskva (Pensoft). 312 pp., 142 plates.

External links
 Pfeiffer L. (1847-1848). Monographia Heliceorum viventium. Sistens descriptiones systematicas et criticas omnium huius familiae generum et specierum hodie cognitarum. Volumen primum. (1): 1–160 [1847, < 8 September; (2): 161–320 [1847, > 27 September]; (3): i–xxxii, 321–484 [1848, < 23 June]. Lipsiae: F. A. Brockhaus]

cruciata
Gastropods described in 1820